Marlon Rezende Emídio Costa (born 20 January 1995) is a Bissau-Guinean footballer playing in Portugal's Liga 3 who plays for Oriental Dragon FC as a midfielder.

Football career
Prior to leaving Guinea-Bissau to play in the Portuguese league, Costa played in youth leagues for Mavegro FC and FC Tigres de Fronteira; in Portugal, he joined Vitória Setúbal's non-professional teams. He later signed on with Vitória Setúbal professionally. He debuted on 12 January 2014 in a 2013–14 Primeira Liga match against Olhanense. During this time, he was loaned to Pinhalnovense, Sacavenense, and Reguengos. In 2016, he signed a 1.5 year contract with S.C. Farense. Farense loaned Costa to Real SC between February to June 2016 before trading him in 2017. Real SC subsequently loaned him to Camacha.

After a season, he left Real SC and Camacha for Portimonense's U23 team for a year before joining their professional team. In 2020, he signed a two-year contract with Oriental Dragon FC. He debuted for this team on 17 September 2021.

References

External links

Stats and profile at LPFP 

Marlon Costa at ZeroZero

1995 births
Living people
Association football midfielders
Vitória F.C. players
C.D. Pinhalnovense players
A.D. Camacha players
Real S.C. players
Portimonense S.C. players
Primeira Liga players
Liga Portugal 2 players
People from Bissau
Sportspeople from Bissau
Bissau-Guinean footballers
Bissau-Guinean expatriate footballers